Willis Rushton (birth registered third ¼ 1936) is an English former professional rugby league footballer who played in the 1960s.

Background
Willis Rushton's birth was registered in Pontefract district, West Riding of Yorkshire, England.

Playing career
Willis Rushton played his first game for Bramley RLFC on the 15th August 1959, in a home game against Rochdale Hornets.
Willis Rushton made his début for Wakefield Trinity during February 1964, and he played his last match for Wakefield Trinity during the 1966–67 season.

Genealogical information
Willis Rushton's marriage to Beryl R. (née Berry) was registered during fourth ¼ 1957 in Pontefract district.

References

External links

Search for "Rushton" at rugbyleagueproject.org
Bramley Legend - Willis Rushton

1936 births
Living people
Bramley RLFC players
English rugby league players
Rugby league centres
Rugby league players from Pontefract
Wakefield Trinity players